Searles Valley is a census-designated place (CDP) in the Searles Valley of the Mojave Desert, in northwestern San Bernardino County, California.

Geography
Searles Valley includes the unincorporated communities of Argus, Pioneer Point, Searles Valley (town), and  Trona.  Searles Valley is located at  (35.765181, -117.382803).

Searles Valley CDP is at the western edge of Searles Lake, a dry lakebed in the lowest part of the Searles Valley.

Searles Valley CDP is about 170 miles northeast of Los Angeles, on State Route 178. It is southwest of Death Valley and the Panamint Range.  Ridgecrest and China Lake are to the west.

According to the United States Census Bureau, Searles Valley has a total area of 27.2 km2 (10.5 mi2), all land. The population was 1,739 at the 2010 census. The ZIP code is 93562 and the area code 760.

Natural history
The Searles Lake is an endorheic dry lake formed by the evaporation of lakes during the late Quaternary period.  It contains rich deposits of chemicals, including borax and rock salt.

Searles Valley is known for its isolation and desolation,  as well as the nearby Trona Pinnacles a few miles to the south. The Trona Pinnacles are an unusual landscape of more than 500 tufa spires, some as high as 140 feet, rising from the bed of the Searles Lake basin.

The name Trona is derived from the mineral trona, abundant in the lake.  The local school plays on a dirt football field because the high level of salt kills grass.

2019 earthquakes
In July 2019, Searles Valley was impacted by a series of earthquakes, the principal events (with magnitudes of 6.4, 5.4, and 7.1 ) occurring from 12 to 18 kilometers west on the Naval Air Weapons Station China Lake. The earthquake series started at 10:02 AM on July 4 with a Mw 4.0 earthquake 4 kilometers southwest of Searles Valley. At 10:33 AM a second and much stronger earthquake struck – a 6.4 magnitude quake 12 kilometers southwest of Searles Valley. The earthquake was felt throughout the area and Southern California, including Los Angeles, and in Nevada, including Las Vegas. The earthquake was 10.5 kilometers deep.  Over 100 aftershocks impacted Searles Valley and nearby Ridgecrest, California. This second quake was followed by an even larger 7.1  magnitude quake, subsequently designated the main quake in the series, on Friday, July 5, 2019, at approximately 8:18 PM.

Approximately 6:36 PM on July 22, 2019, the valley received a 3.9 magnitude quake.

Government
In the state legislature Searles Valley is located in  California's 16th State Senate district, represented by Republican Roy Ashburn, and in California's 33rd State Assembly district, represented by Republican Tim Donnelly.

Demographics

2010
The 2010 United States Census reported that Searles Valley had a population of 1,739. The racial makeup of Searles Valley was 1,405 (80.8%) White (72.3% Non-Hispanic White), 69 (4.0%) African American, 56 (3.2%) Native American, 16 (0.9%) Asian, 6 (0.3%) Pacific Islander, 83 (4.8%) from other races, and 104 (6.0%) from two or more races. Hispanic or Latino of any race were 293 persons (16.8%).

The Census reported that 1,739 people (100% of the population) lived in households, 0 (0%) lived in non-institutionalized group quarters, and 0 (0%) were institutionalized.

There were 722 households, out of which 215 (29.8%) had children under the age of 18 living in them, 309 (42.8%) were opposite-sex married couples living together, 92 (12.7%) had a female householder with no husband present, 52 (7.2%) had a male householder with no wife present.  There were 48 (6.6%) unmarried opposite-sex partnerships, and 3 (0.4%) same-sex married couples or partnerships. 223 households (30.9%) were made up of individuals, and 80 (11.1%) had someone living alone who was 65 years of age or older. The average household size was 2.41.  There were 453 families (62.7% of all households); the average family size was 3.01.

The population was spread out, with 436 people (25.1%) under the age of 18, 171 people (9.8%) aged 18 to 24, 342 people (19.7%) aged 25 to 44, 515 people (29.6%) aged 45 to 64, and 275 people (15.8%) who were 65 years of age or older.  The median age was 40.7 years. For every 100 females, there were 104.1 males.  For every 100 females age 18 and over, there were 101.4 males.

The homeowner vacancy rate was 1.5%; the rental vacancy rate was 8.4%.  1,041 people (59.9% of the population) lived in owner-occupied housing units and 698 people (40.1%) lived in rental housing units.

According to the 2010 United States Census, Searles Valley had a median household income of $32,448, with 21.7% of the population living below the federal poverty line.

2000
As of the 2000 United States Census of 2000, there were 1,885 people, 738 households, and 495 families residing in the CDP.  The population density was 61.9/km2 (160.5/mi2).  There were 1,051 housing units at an average density of 34.5/km2 (89.5/mi2).  The racial makeup of the CDP was 86.3% White, 1.5% African American, 2.4% Native American, 0.7% Asian, 0.4% Pacific Islander, 5.0% from other races, and 3.7% from two or more races. Hispanic or Latino of any race were 16.2% of the population.

There were 738 households, out of which 33.2% had children under the age of 18 living with them, 49.3% were married couples living together, 12.9% had a female householder with no husband present, and 32.9% were non-families. 29.3% of all households were made up of individuals, and 10.6% had someone living alone who was 65 years of age or older.  The average household size was 2.55 and the average family size was 3.16.

In the CDP, the population was spread out, with 30.9% under the age of 18, 8.2% from 18 to 24, 25.3% from 25 to 44, 24.9% from 45 to 64, and 10.7% who were 65 years of age or older.  The median age was 36 years. For every 100 females, there were 104.2 males.  For every 100 females age 18 and over, there were 99.1 males.

The median income for a household in the CDP was $35,833, and the median income for a family was $37,143. Males had a median income of $44,397 versus $35,625 for females. The per capita income for the CDP was $16,861.  About 18.2% of families and 21.4% of the population were below the poverty line, including 33.0% of those under age 18 and 10.1% of those age 65 or over.

See also
Ballarat, California — ghost town
Trona Pinnacles

Gallery

References

External links

 The Searles Valley Historical Society

Searles Valley
Census-designated places in San Bernardino County, California
Company towns in California
Populated places in the Mojave Desert
1913 establishments in California
Populated places established in 1913
Census-designated places in California